José Miguel Rocha Silva (born 1 April 1994 in Portimão) known as Zé Miguel, is a Portuguese footballer who plays for Portimonense as a midfielder.

Football career
On 12 January 2013, Zé Miguel made his professional debut with Portimonense in a 2012–13 Segunda Liga game against Arouca and played 13 minutes, as a substitute.

External links

1994 births
Living people
Portuguese footballers
Association football midfielders
Liga Portugal 2 players
Portimonense S.C. players
People from Portimão
Sportspeople from Faro District